The Wordsworth McAndrew Awards celebrate Guyanese who have made important contributions to the country's cultural life. Awardees' talents include broadcasting, cultural promotion, drama, music, painting, theatre, and writing. The awards, founded in 2002, are presented by the Guyana Folk Festival, a Brooklyn, NY, USA-based organization.

The awards honour Wordsworth McAndrew, one of Guyana's leading folklorists, poets and creative artists.

Awardees
In 2002 there were 36 awardees, reflecting the number of years since Guyana's independence in 1966. The first recipients of the award were: 

The 37 awardees in 2003 were: 

The 2004 Wordsworth McAndrew Awardees were selected from a list of 150 persons nominated by Guyanese worldwide. The Awards Ceremony took place on 3 September 2004 at the Rose Castle Grand Ballroom in Brooklyn, New York. The 38 awardees were:

References

Guyanese culture
Guyanese awards